The Bucharest Symphony Orchestra is a Romanian orchestra based in Bucharest, founded in 2006 by the Philson Young Association. In 2022, John Axelrod  was appointed Principal Conductor of the Bucharest Symphony Orchestra. Previously, Jin Wang (2017-2019) and Benoît Fromanger occupied the leading musical position (2011–2017). Between 2006–2012, Bucharest Symphony Orchestra performed in concert halls such as the Romanian Athenaeum, National Theatre Bucharest, Romanian National Opera and Sala Palatului.

History 
 December 14, 2010 – Bucharest Symphony Orchestra performed in the All Stars Christmas Show
 Bucharest Symphony Orchestra Reviews and Photos from All Stars Christmas
 Bucharest Symphony Orchestra featuring Smiley, Elena Gheorghe, Cristina Rus in All Stars Christmas Show
 December 30, 2010 – Angela Gheorghiu was celebrated by the Bucharest Symphony Orchestra in her 2010 Anniversary Gala
 March 29, 2011 – Phoenix & Bucharest Symphony Orchestra performed at the Opera
 August 18/19, 2012 – Bucharest Symphony Orchestra performed at Calenzana

Discography 
The orchestra’s portfolio includes four audio recordings.
 "Mel Bonis" – complete orchestral works, published by Chant de Linos
 "Very Classic" – double CD signed Marcel Pavel –  opera arias, chansonnettes and crossover
 "Beethoven – The Titan"
 "Red Mansion Dream" – 2018, composer Erqing Wang

References

External links 
 Bucharest Symphony Orchestra — Official Website
 Bucharest Symphony Orchestra YouTube
 The Tour of Bucharest Symphony Orchestra in four countries of South America — Brazil, Argentina, Chile and Peru

Musical groups established in 2006
Culture in Bucharest
Romanian orchestras